The Thunder Bay Public Library serves the citizens of Thunder Bay, Ontario, Canada and surrounding areas.

Services
Information and reference services 
Access to full text databases 
Community information 
Internet access 
Reader's advisory services 
Programs for children, youth and adults 
 Delivery to homebound individuals
 Interlibrary loan
 Free downloadable audiobooks

History

The library got its start when the Port Arthur Library opened a Mechanics' Institute in the schoolhouse in 1876. Membership fees were $20.00 for life or $2.00 per year. The present building at 285 Red River Road opened on June 1, 1951 as the Port Arthur Public Library.

Library services for Fort William began in 1885 when Canadian Pacific Railway (CPR) employees opened a bath, along with a smoking and literary room, with a library attached in the Round House at West Fort William. Fees were $1.25 per year for CPR employees; non-employees were required to pay $1.25 for use of the tub.

With the assistance of a $50,000 grant from the Carnegie Foundation, the Fort William Library moved to its new location at 216 South Brodie Street in 1912, with Mary J. L. Black as the librarian (who served from 1909 to 1937). In 1966 the front entrance was rebuilt. The Brodie Resource Library celebrated its centennial on April 29, 2012.

The present Thunder Bay Public Library officially came into being in 1970, after the amalgamation of the Port Arthur and Fort William branches. The inaugural meeting of the Library Board was held in January, 1970; the Chairman opened the meeting by outlining the problems facing the Board in integrating the operations of the two branches. It was also deemed essential that a logo should be created for use on stationary, posters, signs and cards. A contest was held requesting designs from the public, and in March 1971 the first prize design was adopted, showing a Native Canadian reading a book. The logo was revised in March 1992 by Barry Smith to reflect a more modern outlook.  There was a new logo launched in May 2010, which was developed in consultation with Generator Strategy Advertising with input from the community.

Bookmobile

The Thunder Bay Public Library purchased a bookmobile in 1976 in order to provide decentralized library service to the amalgamated city's suburbs and rural areas.  The bookmobile began its service in November 1976.  Within its first year, it doubled its number of stops; by the fall of 1977 its schedule included eighteen different stops.  Due to budget cutbacks, the bookmobile service was stopped in 1986.  The library sold the bookmobile in 1986.

Branches

Former branches 
The Thunder Bay Public Library opened a branch in Victoriaville Mall in 1981. The Victoriaville Branch Library housed the fiction collection from the Brodie Resource Library.  A 1977 study determined that a larger library was needed in Thunder Bay South, but because Brodie was found to be a historic building, they decided to split its collection with a satellite branch; Brodie became the south end reference and resource branch.  Victoriaville Branch Library remained open until May 14, 1995, the year the library opened a branch in the County Fair Mall; at that time, the fiction collection that was housed in Victoriaville was reintegrated into the Brodie Resource Library.  A farewell tea for the branch was held on Friday, May 12.

Brodie Research Library 
The Brodie Resource Library began as the Fort William Public Library, which opened on April 29, 1912. Renovations to the Brodie Resource Library for fiction reintegration began on April 10, 1995. A new Children's Department and adult fiction area were created during that time. The new areas opened to the public in June 1995. On February 27, 1982, the city's Local Architectural Conservation Advisory Committee (LACAC) designated the Brodie Street Library as a historically significant building. The Brodie Resource Library has since been renamed the Brodie Community Hub to keep with the Thunder Bay Public Library's move towards a community hub system of librarianship.

County Park Community Hub 
On December 9, 1995, the County Park Branch Library, located in County Fair Mall, opened its doors after much public interest from local area residents (the need for a library in this area of the city was identified in facility studies conducted in 1977 and 1987).  The population shift to this area of the city and the outlying region meant the library had to rethink service points and access for the citizens; subsequently, this location has remained very busy since its inception.

Mary J. L. Black Community Hub 
The original Mary J. L. Black branch was created as part of the Fort William Public Library (now amalgamated as part of the Thunder Bay Public Libraries) in the Westfort district of Fort William. The branch opened on January 15, 1932. The Mary J. L. Black branch is named after the first librarian of the Fort William Public Library, Mary J. L. Black. The new Mary J. L. Black Community Hub has been located at 901 Edward St South in southern Thunder Bay since its opening in 2011.

Waverley Community Hub 
The Waverley Community Hub, located at 285 Red River Road, was constructed in 1951 and expanded in 1973. In 2017, the Thunder Bay Public Libraries began the Waverley Renewal Project, seeking over five million dollars for renovations to the Waverley Branch with plans to begin renovating in 2019.

Technology

After the designation of the Brodie Street Library as a historically significant building, work focused on the automation project, which was installed in 1986. The GEAC online circulation system was launched in June 1986, and in 1994, the library upgraded its automation system to the GEAC Advance system. The GEAC system was replaced in 2005 with Innovative Interfaces Inc.'s Millennium Library system. Millennium Library system was replaced in the fall of 2016 with Innovative Interfaces Inc.' Sierra Integrated Library System.

In 1995, the Thunder Bay Public Library launched the first phase of their self-service options with a self-check unit.  At Waverley, the unit had 17, 121 people use it in 1995, signing out more than 45,000 items.  1995 also saw the library's acquisition of the first multimedia CD ROM encyclopedias, internet access for staff (established through a sponsorship from Foxnet), and the launch of an online version of the Thunder Bay Index (established through the sponsorship of The Chronicle-Journal).

The Thunder Bay Public Library launched Encore as its new online catalogue in the spring of 2018.

See also
Public libraries in Ontario
Ask Ontario

References

External links
 Thunder Bay Public Library
Ontario Public Libraries
 Book a Library Computer Online
 Online fine payment
 Social Web Sites 
 FaceBook Page

Culture of Thunder Bay
Public libraries in Ontario
Carnegie libraries in Canada
Buildings and structures in Thunder Bay
Education in Thunder Bay
Libraries established in 1970
1970 establishments in Canada